Graham Barry Hair (born 1943) is an Australian composer, music scholar and retired academic. He was educated at the University of Melbourne, graduating with a Bachelor of Music degree in 1964 and a Master of Music degree three years later. He then completed a doctorate at the University of Sheffield, which was awarded in 1973. He worked at Riverina College of Advanced Education between 1973 and 1975, before being appointed to a lectureship at La Trobe University in 1976. In 1980, he became Head of the School of Composition at the New South Wales State Conservatorium of Music, where he remained until 1990, when he was appointed Gardiner Professor of Music at the University of Glasgow. He retired from the chair in 2001.

References 

Living people
1943 births
Australian musicologists
Australian composers
University of Melbourne alumni
Alumni of the University of Sheffield
Academic staff of La Trobe University
Academics of the University of Glasgow
Winners of the Albert H. Maggs Composition Award